Sciocoris longifrons is a species of stink bug in the family Pentatomidae. It is found in North America.

References

Further reading

 
 
 
 
 
 
 
 

Sciocorini
Insects described in 1933